The 2010 Australian Sports Sedan season was the 26th season of Australian Sports Sedan motor racing in which a national championship or national series has been contested. The season featured the 2010 Kerrick Sports Sedan Series, which began on 6 March 2010 at Wakefield Park and ended on 24 October at Phillip Island Grand Prix Circuit after fifteen races. The series was televised on SBS program SBS Speedweek.

The series was won by kart racer James Sera, contesting his first national circuit racing series in the Saab 9-3 of 2003 Kerrick Sports Sedan Series winner Dean Randle. Despite missing the opening round of the series Sera claimed the title by 17 points over 2008 champion Darren Hossack (Audi A4). Sera took six wins and six seconds from his twelve starts in a near perfect season. Hossack took six wins but took no points away from the Morgan Park round after an engine failure. Hossack finished almost 80 points clear of third in the points, multiple series champion Kerry Baily. Baily, driving a Nissan 300ZX, was one of three drivers to take a single race win, all at the season's opening round at Wakefield Park. The other two drivers were outgoing champion Des Wall (Chevrolet Corvette) and Mazda RX-7 driver Trent Young.

Vehicle eligibility
The series was open to the following automobiles:
 Sports Sedans complying with the Group 3D Sports Sedan Regulations as per the 2010 CAMS Manual of Motorsport
 Trans-am automobiles complying with A.S.S.C. regulations for North American Trans-am competition
 TraNZam automobiles complying with TRG of New Zealand regulations

Teams and drivers

The following drivers competed in the 2010 Kerrick Sports Sedan Series.

Series calendar
The 2010 Kerrick Sports Sedan Series was contested over five rounds, each of which was held at Shannons Nationals Motor Racing Championships rounds.

Points system
Points were awarded on a 20-17-15-13-12-11-10-9-8-7-6-5-4-3-2 basis for the top fifteen positions in each race, with each other finisher receiving 1 point. There were two bonus points allocated to the driver gaining pole position at each round.

Series results

Note: The driver gaining pole position at each round is indicated in bold text

References

External links
 Official series website
 Shannons Nationals Motor Racing Championships
 2010 Racing Results Archive

National Sports Sedan Series
Sports Sedans